Charles A. Spano Jr. (born 1948), sometimes bylined without his middle initial, is an American writer who co-wrote one of the first original novels based on the universe of the Star Trek television series. Spock, Messiah!, co-authored by Theodore R. Cogswell and Spano Jr. It was first published by Bantam Books in 1976, and reissued in October 1984 and by the Bantam imprint Spectra in September 1993 (cover by Kazuhiko Sano).

Born in Scranton, Pennsylvania and a teacher by profession, he is married to Mary Rose McAndrew, with whom he has four children. Among his other writings are the short-short story "Drawing Board", published in the anthology Microcosmic Tales (Taplinger, 1980) and edited by Isaac Asimov, Martin H. Greenberg &  Joseph D. Olander; and the short story "Grain of Truth", published in the digest Analog Science Fiction and Science Fact (Dec. 1980) and reprinted in the book A Spadeful of Spacetime (Ace, 1981), edited by Fred Saberhagen. He has also been writing an alternate history novel centering on Alaska.

External links
The Locus Index to Science Fiction
Index to Science Fiction Anthologies and Collections, Combined Edition
Bibliography Summary

  (no LC catalog records April 2022)

1948 births
Living people
American science fiction writers
20th-century American novelists
American male novelists
20th-century American male writers